The 1931 Oklahoma A&M Cowboys football team represented Oklahoma A&M College in the 1931 college football season. This was the 31st year of football at A&M and the third under Pappy Waldorf. The Cowboys played their home games at Lewis Field in Stillwater, Oklahoma. They finished the season 8–2–1 overall and 1–0 in the Missouri Valley Conference.

Schedule

References

Oklahoma AandM
Oklahoma State Cowboys football seasons
Oklahoma AandM Football